Martonvásár is the 11th largest town in Fejér county, Hungary. It's a popular tourist destination in Hungary because of the Brunszvik Palace where Ludwig van Beethoven stayed and wrote "Für Elise". There is also a museum for Beethoven. The town is also famous for its English garden.

Gallery

External links

  in Hungarian

Populated places in Fejér County
Palaces in Hungary